2730 Barks, provisional designation , is a carbonaceous asteroid from the central regions of the asteroid belt, approximately 15 kilometers in diameter. It was discovered on 30 August 1981, by American astronomer Edward Bowell at Anderson Mesa Station, Arizona, United States. The asteroid was named after comic-book illustrator Carl Barks.

Orbit and classification 

Barks orbits the Sun in the central main-belt at a distance of 2.4–3.1 AU once every 4 years and 6 months (1,640 days). Its orbit has an eccentricity of 0.13 and an inclination of 6° with respect to the ecliptic.

The body's observation arc begins with a precovery taken at Palomar Observatory in 1954, or 27 years prior to its official discovery observation at Anderson Mesa.

Physical characteristics 

In the SMASS taxonomy, Barks is characterized as a carbonaceous C-type asteroid.

Rotation period 

In August 2012, a rotational lightcurve of Barks was obtained from photometric observations by astronomers at the  Oakley Southern Sky Observatory in Australia. Lightcurve analysis gave a well-defined rotation period of 6.084 hours with a brightness variation of 0.26 magnitude. This concurs with observations taken at the Palomar Transient Factory in January 2011, which gave a period of 6.087 hours and an amplitude of 0.28 magnitude.

Diameter and albedo 

According to the surveys carried out by the Japanese Akari satellite and NASA's Wide-field Infrared Survey Explorer with its subsequent NEOWISE mission, Barks measures between 9.87 and 15.830 kilometers in diameter and its surface has an albedo between 0.162 and 0.415.

The Collaborative Asteroid Lightcurve Link assumes a standard albedo for carbonaceous asteroids of 0.057 and calculates a diameter of 24.30 kilometers with an absolute magnitude of 11.8.

Naming 

This minor planet was named for American cartoonist Carl Barks (1901–2000), best known for the fictional character Scrooge McDuck he created while working at Walt Disney in the late 1940s. In many of his stories, he described space  exploration and adventure. Barks was one of the first to use the term "rubble pile asteroid".

Peter Thomas, an assistant of Cornell University, proposed the idea of naming an asteroid after Barks. The approved naming citation was published by the Minor Planet Center on 28 January 1983. A week later, Thomas informed Barks by mail about his initiative.

References

External links 
 Helnwein Talks with Carl Barks, 11 July 1992
 Asteroid Lightcurve Database (LCDB), query form (info )
 Dictionary of Minor Planet Names, Google books
 Asteroids and comets rotation curves, CdR – Observatoire de Genève, Raoul Behrend
 Discovery Circumstances: Numbered Minor Planets (1)-(5000) – Minor Planet Center
 
 

002730
Discoveries by Edward L. G. Bowell
Named minor planets
002730
19810830